Mihingarangi Forbes (born ), also known as Mihi Forbes and Joanne Forbes, is a New Zealand journalist, television presenter and radio broadcaster. She has worked on current affairs shows including Campbell Live, 20/20, and Native Affairs. In 2008, she won a Qantas award for 'Best Reporter for Daily Current Affairs' and in 2020 she won 'Best Presenter: News and Current Affairs' at the New Zealand Television Awards.

Forbes is known for leading a 2013 investigation into alleged misspending by the Te Kōhanga Reo Trust Board.

Early life 
Her father is a "Māori bushman" of Ngāti Paoa and Ngāti Maniapoto heritage, and her mother, a counsellor is Pākehā (non-Māori), and a relative of Kate Sheppard. Although Forbes's grandmother was fluent in Māori, she spoke English at home.

As a child, Forbes was deeply interested in journalism and storytelling, using a tape recorder to deliver fictional news and weather bulletins for her family.

Forbes graduated from Feilding High School in 1990. When she turned 19 or 20, she attended Waikato Institute of Technology Te Ataarangi Māori-language immersion college and became fluent in te reo. Despite originally being known as Joanne, Forbes changed her name to Mihingarangi after her immersion experience – she and her fellow students had translated their names into Māori during the programme, and the new name stuck.

Career 
After finishing school, Forbes worked at a bar for a year before moving to Auckland. In 1993, she read community news for Tainui Radio. Despite her lack of formal journalism training, in the 1990s Forbes was offered an internship with TVNZ's Māori news programme Te Karere. Following the birth of her first child in 2001, she worked briefly as a producer for Radio New Zealand. After that, Forbes worked as producer for the TV3 current affairs show 20/20.

In 2008, Forbes was working at TV3's current affairs show Campbell Live, earning a Qantas award for 'Best Reporter for Daily Current Affairs'. During her time on the show, she conducted an infamous interview with businessman Alasdair Thompson, challenging his earlier comments about women earning less pay because of their menstruation cycles.

Māori Television 
In 2012, Forbes joined Māori Television as the producer of news show Te Kāea. In February 2013, Forbes became presenter of Māori Television's current affairs show Native Affairs. During a well-known 2014 interview with Jamie Whyte — a political candidate for ACT New Zealand — Forbes exposed his ignorance of the Māori health initiative Whanau Ora.

Kōhanga Reo National Trust scandal 
In October 2013, Native Affairs aired an investigation led by Forbes into alleged misspending by the Te Kōhanga Reo Trust Board. The show had obtained credit card transaction details of one board member and the general manager of the trust fund's charitable subsidiary. The day after the show aired, Education Minister Hekia Parata and Māori Affairs Minister Pita Sharples met several trust board members at Parliament to discuss the allegations.

Resignation 
On 4 June 2015, Forbes announced her resignation from Māori TV on Twitter. Media reports suggested that her departure from Māori TV was related to increasing editorial pressure on her work – her followup story on the Kohanga Reo National Trust had been held back, delayed without a clear explanation why. Forbes stated that she had felt she was "losing control" of her stories.

In 2016, after her resignation Maori Television accused Forbes of taking several items of designer clothing from the company wardrobe without permission, breaking the story within hours of the launch of her new current affairs show, The Hui  Forbes  denied any wrongdoing, confirming to reporters that the clothing had been promised to her by her former boss at the company  as compensation for additional work completed.

Present-day 
One day after her resignation from Māori TV, it was announced that Forbes was joining Radio New Zealand as a specialist correspondent for Māori affairs.
Forbes is currently presenter of Māori-oriented current affairs show, The Hui, which airs on Three New Zealand on Sunday mornings.

Personal life 
Forbes is married to cameraman Afa Rasmussen and has four children, two with former partner Duncan Garner. Forbes is a strong advocate for te reo, and is raising her children to speak both Māori and English.

See also
 List of New Zealand television personalities

References

External links 
 

New Zealand journalists
1970s births
New Zealand women journalists
New Zealand radio journalists
New Zealand reporters and correspondents
New Zealand television journalists
New Zealand television presenters
New Zealand television producers
Women television producers
New Zealand Māori broadcasters
New Zealand Māori women
People from Feilding
People educated at Feilding High School
Living people
New Zealand women television journalists
New Zealand women radio journalists
New Zealand radio presenters
New Zealand women radio presenters
New Zealand women television presenters
Ngāti Pāoa people
Ngāti Maniapoto people